Roepkiella is a genus of moths in the family Cossidae.

Species
 Roepkiella artushka (R.V. Yakovlev, 2006)
 Roepkiella celebensis (Roepke, 1957)
 Roepkiella chloratus (Swinhoe, 1892)
 Roepkiella chloratoides (Holloway, 1986)
 Roepkiella fuscibasis (Hampson, 1895)
 Roepkiella ingae Yakovlev, 2011
 Roepkiella javana (Roepke, 1957)
 Roepkiella loeffleri (R.V. Yakovlev, 2006)
 Roepkiella nigromaculata (Hampson, 1892)
 Roepkiella pusillus (Roepke, 1957)
 Roepkiella rufidorsia (Hampson, 1905)
 Roepkiella siamica Yakovlev & Witt, 2009
 Roepkiella subfuscus (Snellen, 1895)
 Roepkiella thaika (R.V. Yakovlev, 2006)

References

 , 2006, New Cossidae (Lepidoptera) from Asia, Africa and Macronesia, Tinea 19 (3): 188-213.
 , 2009: The Carpenter Moths (Lepidoptera:Cossidae) of Vietnam. Entomofauna Supplement 16: 11-32.

External links
Natural History Museum Lepidoptera generic names catalog

Cossinae